Juan Benavides (born 5 February 1942) is a Cuban weightlifter. He competed in the men's middle heavyweight event at the 1968 Summer Olympics.

References

1942 births
Living people
Cuban male weightlifters
Olympic weightlifters of Cuba
Weightlifters at the 1968 Summer Olympics
Sportspeople from Guantánamo
Pan American Games medalists in weightlifting
Pan American Games bronze medalists for Cuba
Weightlifters at the 1971 Pan American Games
20th-century Cuban people
21st-century Cuban people